Szigetszentmiklós is a district in south-western part of Pest County. Szigetszentmiklós is also the name of the town where the district seat is found. The district is located in the Central Hungary Statistical Region.

Geography 
Szigetszentmiklós District borders with Budapest to the north, Gyál District and Dabas District to the east, Ráckeve District to the south, Érd District to the west. The number of the inhabited places in Szigetszentmiklós District is 9.

Municipalities 
The district has 6 towns, 1 large village and 2 villages.
(ordered by population, as of 1 January 2013)

The bolded municipalities are cities, italics municipality is large village.

Demographics

In 2011, it had a population of 110,448 and the population density was 523/km².

Ethnicity
Besides the Hungarian majority, the main minorities are the German (approx. 3,700), Roma (1,300), Slovak (1,100), Romanian (550), Croat (350), Bulgarian (250), Serb and Russian (200), Slovak (100).

Total population (2011 census): 110,448
Ethnic groups (2011 census): Identified themselves: 100,804 persons:
Hungarians: 92,788 (92.05%)
Germans: 3,708 (3.68%)
Gypsies: 1,270 (1.26%)
Others and indefinable: 3,038 (3.01%)
Approx. 9,500 persons in Szigetszentmiklós District did not declare their ethnic group at the 2011 census.

Religion
Religious adherence in the county according to 2011 census:

Catholic – 32,188 (Roman Catholic – 30,519; Greek Catholic – 1,665);
Reformed – 12,343;
Evangelical – 995;
Orthodox – 188;
other religions – 2,722; 
Non-religious – 24,274; 
Atheism – 2,206;
Undeclared – 35,532.

Gallery

See also
List of cities and towns in Hungary

References

External links
 Postal codes of the Szigetszentmiklós District

Districts in Pest County